Takab Rural District is a rural district (dehestan) in Shahdad District, Kerman County, Kerman Province, Iran. At the 2006 census, its population was 4,868 in 1,127 families. The rural district has 35 villages.

References 

Rural Districts of Kerman Province
Kerman County